The 1970–71 Vancouver Canucks season was the Canucks' first in the NHL. They joined the league on May 22, 1970, along with the Buffalo Sabres. After not being awarded an expansion team in 1967 when the league added six teams, Vancouver finally joined the NHL in 1970 for a price of $6 million (compared to $2 million in 1967). The Vancouver Canucks of the Western Hockey League were promoted to the NHL, though the ownership group of the WHL Canucks, not willing to pay the $6 million to join the NHL, sold the team to Medicor, a group controlled by Thomas Scallen.

The Canucks logo was a stylized C designed as a hockey stick inside a rink incorporating the colours of blue, green and white to represent the water, forests and snow surrounding Vancouver. It was designed by a local creative designer, Joe Borovich, and bought for $500.

During the Amateur draft, held on June 11 in Montreal, there was debate over what expansion team would draft first. In order to reach a compromise, a numbered spinning wheel was brought in to determine the draft: the Sabres were odd numbers, the Canucks even. When the wheel landed on 11, the Canucks and NHL President Clarence Campbell thought it was II (two) in Roman numerals. However it turned out to be 11 (eleven) in Arabic numerals, leading the Sabres to select first overall future superstar Gilbert Perreault.

On October 9, 1970, the Canucks played their first game in the NHL, a 3–1 loss to the Los Angeles Kings. There was a grand opening ceremony attended by British Columbia Premier W. A. C. Bennett, Mayor of Vancouver Tom Campbell (who was booed by fans), Chief Dan George and former Vancouver Millionaires player Cyclone Taylor, who received a standing ovation upon being introduced. Barry Wilkins scored the first goal for the Canucks in the third period.

Inexplicably, the Canucks were placed in the East Division, which was not only the tougher division but featured opponents over 2,000 miles away from Vancouver. (The Canucks were nearly a .500 team at home, but could only win seven of 39 road games.) Throughout the first three months of the season, though, the expansion club managed to stay within contention of a playoff spot, until captain Orland Kurtenbach injured his knee in late December. The Canucks would finish their inaugural season with six 20-goal scorers, and Tallon would break Bobby Orr's rookie record for defenseman assists, but 11-30-5 mark to end the season placed them only one point out of last place.

Regular season

Schedule and results

|-  style="text-align:center; background:#fbb;"
| 1 || October 9 || Los Angeles || 3–1 || Vancouver || 0–1–0 || 0
|-  style="text-align:center; background:#bfb;"
| 2 || October 11 || Toronto || 3–5 || Vancouver || 1–1–0 || 2
|-  style="text-align:center; background:#fbb;"
| 3 || October 12 || Vancouver || 1–4 || St. Louis  || 1–2–0 || 2
|-  style="text-align:center; background:#fbb;"
| 4 || October 14 || Vancouver || 2–8 || Chicago || 1–3–0 || 2
|-  style="text-align:center; background:#fbb;"
| 5 || October 15 || Vancouver || 4–5 || Philadelphia || 1–4–0 || 2
|-  style="text-align:center; background:#fbb;"
| 6 || October 18 || Boston || 5–3 || Vancouver || 1–5–0 || 2
|-  style="text-align:center; background:#bfb;"
| 7 || October 20 || California || 1–2 || Vancouver || 2–5–0 || 4
|-  style="text-align:center; background:#ffb;"
| 8 || October 23 || St. Louis || 1–1 || Vancouver || 2–5–1 || 5
|-  style="text-align:center; background:#ffb;"
| 9 || October 25 || Pittsburgh || 1–1 || Vancouver || 2–5–2 || 6
|-  style="text-align:center; background:#bfb;"
| 10 || October 27 || Buffalo || 2–7 || Vancouver || 3–5–2 || 8
|-  style="text-align:center; background:#fbb;"
| 11 || October 31 || Vancouver || 3–6 || Montreal || 3–6–2 || 8
|-

|-  style="text-align:center; background:#fbb;"
| 12 || November 4 || Vancouver || 3–8 || Pittsburgh || 3–7–2 || 8
|-  style="text-align:center; background:#bfb;"
| 13 || November 5 || Vancouver || 4–1 || Buffalo || 4–7–2 || 10
|-  style="text-align:center; background:#bfb;"
| 14 || November 7 || Toronto|| 2–3 || Vancouver || 5–7–2 || 12
|-  style="text-align:center; background:#fbb;"
| 15 || November 10 || Vancouver || 3–6 || Boston || 5–8–2 || 12
|-  style="text-align:center; background:#bfb;"
| 16 || November 11 || Vancouver || 4–2 || Toronto || 6–8–2 || 14
|-  style="text-align:center; background:#ffb;"
| 17 || November 14 || Vancouver || 3 -3 || Minnesota || 6–8–3 || 15
|-  style="text-align:center; background:#fbb;"
| 18 || November 15 || Vancouver || 2–4 || Chicago || 6–9–3 || 15
|-  style="text-align:center; background:#fbb;"
| 19 || November 17 || Detroit || 5–2 || Vancouver || 6–10–3 || 15
|-  style="text-align:center; background:#bfb;"
| 20 || November 20 || Los Angeles || 1–7 || Vancouver || 7–10–3 || 17
|-  style="text-align:center; background:#bfb;"
| 21 || November 21 || Vancouver || 3–1 || Los Angeles || 8–10–3 || 19
|-  style="text-align:center; background:#bfb;"
| 22 || November 24 || Minnesota || 2–3 || Vancouver || 9–10–3 || 21
|-  style="text-align:center; background:#fbb;"
| 23 || November 26 || Vancouver || 2–4 || Detroit || 9–11–3 || 21
|-  style="text-align:center; background:#fbb;"
| 24 || November 28 || Vancouver || 1–5 || St. Louis || 9–12–3 || 21
|-  style="text-align:center; background:#fbb;"
| 25 || November 29 || Vancouver || 2–4 || Philadelphia || 9–13–3 || 21
|-

|-  style="text-align:center; background:#bfb;"
| 26 || December 1 || Philadelphia || 4–5 || Vancouver || 10–13–3 || 23
|-  style="text-align:center; background:#fbb;"
| 27 || December 5 || Vancouver || 1–3 || Pittsburgh || 10–14–3 || 23
|-  style="text-align:center; background:#fbb;"
| 28 || December 6 || Vancouver || 1–4 || New York || 10–15–3 || 23
|-  style="text-align:center; background:#bfb;"
| 29 || December 8 || New York || 1–4 || Vancouver || 11–15–3 || 25
|-  style="text-align:center; background:#fbb;"
| 30 || December 9 || Vancouver || 1–6 || California || 11–16–3 || 25
|-  style="text-align:center; background:#bfb;"
| 31 || December 12 || California || 2–5 || Vancouver || 12–16–3 || 27
|-  style="text-align:center; background:#bfb;"
| 32 || December 15 || Philadelphia || 2–3 || Vancouver || 13–16–3 || 29
|-  style="text-align:center; background:#fbb;"
| 33 || December 18 || Montreal || 4–3 || Vancouver || 13–17–3 || 29
|-  style="text-align:center; background:#fbb;"
| 34 || December 20 || Vancouver || 1–5 || New York || 13–18–3 || 29
|-  style="text-align:center; background:#fbb;"
| 35 || December 23 || Vancouver || 2–7 || Toronto || 13–19–3 || 29
|-  style="text-align:center; background:#fbb;"
| 36 || December 26 || Chicago || 4–2 || Vancouver || 13–20–3 || 29
|-  style="text-align:center; background:#bfb;"
| 37 || December 30 || Vancouver || 4–1 || Los Angeles || 14–20–3 || 31
|-

|-  style="text-align:center; background:#fbb;"
| 38 || January 2 || St. Louis || 3–1 || Vancouver || 14–21–3 || 31
|-  style="text-align:center; background:#fbb;"
| 39 || January 6 || Vancouver || 3–7 || Montreal || 14–22–3 || 31
|-  style="text-align:center; background:#fbb;"
| 40 || January 7  || Vancouver || 4–6 || Boston || 14–23–3 || 31
|-  style="text-align:center; background:#ffb;"
| 41 || January 9 || Vancouver || 2–2 || St. Louis || 14–23–4 || 32
|-  style="text-align:center; background:#fbb;"
| 42 || January 12 || New York || 4–2 || Vancouver || 14–24–4 || 32
|-  style="text-align:center; background:#fbb;"
| 43 || January 16 || Pittsburgh || 4–3 || Vancouver || 14–25–4 || 32
|-  style="text-align:center; background:#bfb;"
| 44 || January 17 || Vancouver || 3–1 || California || 15–25–4 || 34
|-  style="text-align:center; background:#fbb;"
| 45 || January 20 || Toronto || 5–1 || Vancouver || 15–26–4 || 34
|-  style="text-align:center; background:#fbb;"
| 46 || January 23 || Vancouver || 1–4 || Pittsburgh || 15–27–4 || 34 
|-  style="text-align:center; background:#fbb;"
| 47 || January 24 || Vancouver || 3–7 || Detroit || 15–28–4 || 34
|-  style="text-align:center; background:#ffb;"
| 48 || January 26 || Chicago || 3–3 || Vancouver || 15–28–5 || 35
|-  style="text-align:center; background:#fbb;"
| 49 || January 29 || Minnesota || 2–1 || Vancouver || 15–29–5 || 35
|-  style="text-align:center; background:#fbb;"
| 50 || January 31 || Buffalo || 6–1 || Vancouver || 15–30–5 || 35
|-

|-  style="text-align:center; background:#fbb;"
| 51 || February 2 || Montreal || 5–2 || Vancouver || 15–31–5 || 35
|-  style="text-align:center; background:#fbb;"
| 52 || February 6 || New York || 5–4 || Vancouver || 15–32–5 || 35
|-  style="text-align:center; background:#bfb;"
| 53 || February 9 || Buffalo || 3–6 || Vancouver || 16–32–5 || 37
|-  style="text-align:center; background:#bfb;"
| 54 || February 12 || Detroit || 3–5 || Vancouver || 17–32–5 || 39
|-  style="text-align:center; background:#fbb;"
| 55 || February 14 || Vancouver || 1–3 || Chicago || 17–33–5 || 39
|-  style="text-align:center; background:#bfb;"
| 56 || February 16 || Boston || 4–5 || Vancouver || 18–33–5 || 41
|-  style="text-align:center; background:#fbb;"
| 57 || February 19 || Philadelphia || 3–2 || Vancouver || 18–34–5 || 41
|-  style="text-align:center; background:#ffb;"
| 58 || February 22 || Montreal || 3–3 || Vancouver || 18–34–6 || 42
|-  style="text-align:center; background:#fbb;"
| 59 || February 25 || Vancouver || 3–8 || Boston || 18–35–6 || 42
|-  style="text-align:center; background:#fbb;"
| 60 || February 27 || Vancouver || 1–8 || Philadelphia || 18–36–6 || 42
|-  style="text-align:center; background:#fbb;"
| 61 || February 28 || Vancouver || 2–4 || New York || 18–37–6 || 42
|-

|-  style="text-align:center; background:#fbb;"
| 62 || March 3 || Vancouver || 1–3 || Toronto || 18–38–6 || 42
|-  style="text-align:center; background:#fbb;"
| 63 || March 6 || Vancouver || 1–3 || Minnesota || 18–39–6 || 42
|-  style="text-align:center; background:#fbb;"
| 64 || March 7 || Vancouver || 3–6 || Buffalo || 18–40–6 || 42
|-  style="text-align:center; background:#ffb;"
| 65 || March 9 || Vancouver || 3–3 || Montreal || 18–40–7 || 43
|-  style="text-align:center; background:#bfb;"
| 66 || March 11 || Detroit || 3–7 || Vancouver || 19–40–7 || 45
|-  style="text-align:center; background:#fbb;"
| 67 || March 13 || Boston || 6–3 || Vancouver || 19–41–7 || 45
|-  style="text-align:center; background:#fbb;"
| 68 || March 16 || Chicago || 7–4 || Vancouver || 19–42–7 || 45
|-  style="text-align:center; background:#bfb;"
| 69 || March 19 || Pittsburgh || 4–6 || Vancouver || 20–42–7 || 47
|-  style="text-align:center; background:#fbb;"
| 70 || March 21 || Minnesota || 6–3 || Vancouver || 20–43–7 || 47
|-  style="text-align:center; background:#bfb;"
| 71 || March 23 || St. Louis || 1–4 || Vancouver || 21–43–7 || 49
|-  style="text-align:center; background:#fbb;"
| 72 || March 25 || Vancouver || 3–4 || Detroit || 21–44–7 || 49
|-  style="text-align:center; background:#fbb;"
| 73 || March 26 || Vancouver || 1–3 || Buffalo || 21–45–7 || 49
|-  style="text-align:center; background:#bfb;"
| 74 || March 28 || California || 5–11 || Vancouver || 22–45–7 || 51
|-  style="text-align:center; background:#bfb;"
| 75 || March 30 || Vancouver || 2–1 || Minnesota || 23–45–7 || 53
|-  style="text-align:center; background:#ffb;"
| 76 || March 31 || Vancouver || 2–2 || Los Angeles  || 23–45–8 || 54
|-

|-  style="text-align:center; background:#bfb;"
| 77 || April 2 || Vancouver || 7–2 || California || 24–45–8 || 56
|-  style="text-align:center; background:#fbb;"
| 78 || April 4 || Los Angeles || 4–2 || Vancouver || 24–46–8 || 56
|-

Player statistics

Skaters
Note: GP = Games played; G = Goals; A = Assists; Pts = Points; PIM = Penalty minutes

†Denotes player spent time with another team before joining Vancouver.  Stats reflect time with the Canucks only.

*Denotes player traded by Vancouver midway through the season. Stats reflect time with Canucks only.

Goaltenders
Note: GP = Games played; Min = Minutes; W = Wins; L = Losses; T = Ties; GA = Goals against; SO = Shutouts; GAA = Goals against average

Awards and records

Trophies and awards
Cyclone Taylor Award (Canucks MVP): Orland Kurtenbach
Cyrus H. McLean Trophy (Canucks Leading Scorer): Andre Boudrias
Fred J. Hume Award (Canucks Unsung Hero): Barry Wilkins
Most Exciting Player: Andre Boudrias

Records achieved in the season
Note: Only records that stand as of 2020–21 are listed

Canucks team records
Fewest ties in one season: (8) – repeated in 1971–72, 1986–87, 1988–89
Fewest shutouts in one season: (0) – repeated in 1984–85, 2005–06
Fewest shutouts against in one season: (0) – repeated in 1984–85
Longest home winless streak: 11 games, December 18, 1970 – February 6, 1971 (0–10–1)
Most goals in one game: 11, March 28, 1971 (California 5 at Vancouver 11) – repeated in 1986–87, 1991–92
Most shots against Vancouver goal, one game: 60, February 25, 1971, versus Boston Bruins
Most shots against Vancouver goal, one period: 28, February 25, 1971, versus Boston Bruins (3rd period)
Most shots both teams, one period: 43, February 25, 1971, versus Boston Bruins (3rd period)
Fastest three goals against Vancouver: :20, February 25, 1971, versus Boston Bruins (3rd period: John Bucyk, 4:50; Ed Westfall, 5:02; Ted Green, 5:10)

Canucks individual records
Most assists in one season, rookie: Dale Tallon (42)
Most goals, one game: Rosaire Paiement (4) – repeated eleven times

Transactions
The Canucks were involved in the following transactions during the 1970–71 season.

Trades

Draft picks

Expansion draft
Vancouver's picks at the 1970 NHL Expansion Draft. In order to fill out the rosters of both the Canucks and Buffalo Sabres, they were given the opportunity to select eighteen skaters and two goaltenders from the unprotected lists of existing NHL team's rosters. Teams were allowed to protect several players from being drafted, and as such kept many of their star players, leaving the Canucks and Sabres with lesser quality players to choose from. The draft was held on June 9, 1970, at the Queen Elizabeth Hotel in Montreal, Quebec, Canada. Using a spinning wheel to determine the order of the expansion draft, Buffalo had the first choice.

Amateur draft
Vancouver's picks at the 1970 NHL Amateur Draft. The draft was held on June 11, 1970, at the Queen Elizabeth Hotel in Montreal, Quebec, Canada.

References

Player stats: 2006–07 Vancouver Canucks Media Guide – 1970–71 stats, p. 150.
Game log: 2006–07 Vancouver Canucks Media Guide – 1970–71 stats, p. 150.
Team standings: 2007–08 NHL Official Guide & Record Book, p. 150.
Team records: 2006–07 Vancouver Canucks Media Guide – Canucks all time team & individual records, pp. 225–237

See also
1970–71 NHL season

Vancouver Canucks seasons
Vanc
Vanc